Lavanya may refer to:
 Lavanya (name), an Indian feminine given name
 Lavanya (TV series), a 2004 Indian television series
 Lavanya (actress) (born 1979), Indian actress
 Lavanya (film), a 1951 Indian Tamil-language film
 Lavanya suicide case, 2022 suicide in India

See also
 Lavani